Cobalt(II) carbonate is the inorganic compound with the formula CoCO3.  This reddish paramagnetic solid is an intermediate in the hydrometallurgical purification of cobalt from its ores.  It is an inorganic pigment, and a precursor to catalysts. Cobalt(II) carbonate also occurs as the rare red/pink mineral spherocobaltite.

Preparation and structure
It is prepared by combining solutions cobaltous sulfate and sodium bicarbonate:
CoSO4  +  2 NaHCO3   →   CoCO3  +  Na2SO4  +  H2O  +  CO2
This reaction is used in the precipitation of cobalt from an extract of its roasted ores.

CoCO3 adopts a structure like calcite, consisting of cobalt in an octahedral coordination geometry.

Reactions
Like most transition metal carbonates, cobalt carbonate is insoluble in water, but is readily attacked by mineral acids:
CoCO3  +  2 HCl  +  5 H2O   →   [Co(H2O)6]Cl2  +  CO2
It is used to prepare many coordination complexes. The reaction of cobalt(II) carbonate and acetylacetone in the presence of hydrogen peroxide gives tris(acetylacetonato)cobalt(III).

Heating the carbonate proceeds in a typical way for calcining, except that the product becomes partially oxidized:
 6CoCO3 +  O2  →   2Co3O4  + 6CO2
The resulting Co3O4 converts reversibly to CoO at high temperatures.

Uses
Cobalt carbonate is a precursor to cobalt carbonyl and various cobalt salts.  It is a component of dietary supplements since cobalt is an essential element.  It is a precursor to blue pottery glazes, famously in the case of Delftware.

Related compounds
At least two cobalt(II) carbonate-hydroxides are known: Co2(CO3)(OH)2 and Co6(CO3)2(OH)8·H2O.

The moderately rare spherocobaltite is a natural form of cobalt carbonate, with good specimens coming especially from the Republic of Congo. "Cobaltocalcite" is a cobaltiferous calcite variety that is quite similar in habit to spherocobaltite.

Safety
Toxicity has rarely been observed.  Animals, including humans, require trace amounts of cobalt, a component of vitamin B12.

References

External links
 

Cobalt(II) compounds
Carbonates